India–Switzerland relations, or Indo-Swiss relations, are the bilateral relations between the Republic of India and Switzerland.

History 
The first diplomatic engagement between the countries was a Treaty of Friendship signed at New Delhi on 14 August 1948. Diplomatic missions between the two countries were opened in Bern and Delhi soon after its conclusion. Switzerland established its Consulates General in Mumbai and Bengaluru. India has a Consulate General in Geneva.

Visits

Narendra Modi visited Geneva in 2016 to strengthen the bilateral relations of the two countries. He raised the black money issue with Swiss Government and secured its support for the Indian claim to NSG membership which later Switzerland refuted and took a U-turn on India's NSG (Nuclear Supppliers Group) bid.

Later, the Swiss President Doris Leuthard visited New Delhi, India in August 2017 to improve relations.

Sports relations
There is a relation in Indo-Swiss tennis pair of Leander Paes-Martina Hingis who has completed a Career Grand Slam in Mixed Doubles category: 2015 Australian Open, 2016 French Open, 2015 Wimbledon and 2015 US Open (tennis).

Cop 26
Switzerland criticised India for replacing the phrase “phase out coal” with “phase down coal” in the final draft of Cop 26 summit in Glasgow. India rejected the criticism.
 Foreign relations of India
 Foreign relations of Switzerland

References

External links
 "Bilateral relations Switzerland–India" - eda.admin.ch
 "Switzerland backs India for nuclear exporting club" - swissinfo.ch, June 28, 2016
 "Swiss want inclusive membership of Nuclear Suppliers Group" - swissinfo.ch, June 7, 2017

 
Switzerland
Bilateral relations of Switzerland